The Confederación Panamericana de Billar (CPB) also known as the Pan-American Billiard Confederation, is the governing body of carom billiards in the Americas and is affiliated to the world federation Union Mondiale de Billard (UMB). It has its headquarters in Guatemala.

Work 
It is responsible for the organization of the international tournaments in the Americas. The CPB has currently 21 members, who are responsible for the national level, like the National Championships.

Members 

 FAAB –  Federación Argentina de Aficionados al Billar
 FAB –  Federación Aruba de Billar
 FBB –  Federacion Bolivia de Billiar
 CBBS –  Confederación Brasilera de Billar y Sinuca
 CBSA –  Canadian Billiard & Snooker Association
 FCJB –  Federación Chilena de Juegos de Billar
 FCB –  Federación Colombiana de Billar
 FCRB –  Federación Costarricense de Billar
 FEB –  Federación Ecuatoriana de Billar
 FGB –  Federación Guadalupe de Billar
 ANBG –  Asociación Nacional de Billar de Guatemala
 FHB –  Federación Hondureña de Billar
 FMB –  Federación Mexicana de Billar
 FEBIKO –  Federacion Antillas Holandesas
 FNB –  Federación Nicaragüense de Billar
 FPB –  Federación Panameña de Billar
 FPB –  Federación Peruana de Billar
 CSF –  Cue Sport Foundation (Trinidad & Tobago)
 FBU –  Federación de Billar del Uruguay
 USBA –  United States Billiard Association
 FVB –  Federación Venezolana de Billar

Federation structure

See also 
 African Carom Confederation (ACC)
 Asian Carom Billiard Confederation (ACBC)
 Confédération Européenne de Billard (CEB)

References

External links 
 The history of the CPB 

Carom billiards organizations
Sports organizations established in 1954
Sports organizations of Guatemala
Pan-American sports governing bodies